Ghost forests are areas of dead trees in former forests, typically in coastal regions where rising sea levels or tectonic shifts have altered the height of a land mass. Forests located near the coast or estuaries may also be at risk of dying through saltwater poisoning, if invading seawater reduces the amount of freshwater that deciduous trees receive for sustenance.

By looking at the stratigraphic record it is possible to reconstruct a series of events that lead to the creation of a ghost forest where, in a convergent plate boundary, there has been orogenic uplift, followed by earthquakes resulting in subsidence and tsunamis, altering the coast and creating a ghost forest.

Formations

Sea level changes

When there is a change in sea level, coastal regions may become inundated with sea water. This can alter coastal areas and kill large areas of trees, leaving behind what is called a “ghost forest.”  This type of ghost forest may develop in a variety of environments and in many different places. In the southern US coastal marshes are expanding into dry wooded areas, killing trees and leaving behind areas of dead trees called snags. 
Regions of the US at or below sea level are more susceptible to tides. Coastal features affected by changing sea levels are indirectly affected by climate change. With global sea-level rise, the coastlines in the southern US are being altered and leave behind salt marshes filled with dead and dying trees in some areas.

Tectonic activity

Ghost forests can also result from tectonic activity. In the Pacific Northwest, there is a large, active subduction zone called the Cascadia Subduction Zone. Here, there is a convergent plate boundary where the Gorda plate, the Juan de Fuca plate, and the Explorer plate are being subducted underneath the North American plate. As these plates attempt to slide past one another, they often become stuck. For several hundred years the plates will be locked in place and the tension builds. As a result of this tension, there is orogenic uplift. This is where the tension building between two converging plates gets translated into the vertical uplift of the mountains on the coast. Orogenic uplift is usually associated with earthquakes and mountain building. But then, every 500+ years, there is a large earthquake in the Cascadia Subduction Zone and all that built-up tension is released. The release of this tension results in what is called subsidence. And with subsidence the once elevated coastline drops down several meters to below sea level. Here, sea level has not changed, but the coastline has been deformed, making it susceptible to tides. Areas of the coastline can be inundated with sea water, creating marshes and leaving behind ghost forests.  
The Cascadia event was documented by geologist Brian Atwater in his book, The Orphan Tsunami. Gathering evidence from both the trees and the ground, he determined that the earthquake and tsunami had occurred sometime between 1680 and 1720, but he could not pinpoint the exact date. Japanese scientists, who had extensive records of tsunamis dating back to 684 AD, read the report, and told Atwater thatthey knew the date and even the precise time: January 26, 1700 at 9:00 p.m. Several hours after the earthquake, tsunami waves had crossed the ocean and wiped out a fishing village.  The Japanese were baffled because there was no earthquake anywhere near Japan to account for the tsunami. The ghost forest in Washington thus provided the evidence for its origin.

Tsunamis

In addition to subsidence, large earthquakes can also cause tsunamis. It is possible to determine that ghost forests in the Pacific Northwest were created by earthquakes and subsidence by looking at the stratigraphic record. Digging down into the earth, adjacent to a ghost forest, different layers of sediment can reveal the stratigraphy in a ghost forest.  Layers of material filled with organic material can indicate where the old forest floor was located prior to subsidence. On top of the layer, there will often be a large sandy deposit. This layer represents the tsunami event, where the coast was flooded with sea water that is filled with sandy sediment. Superimposed on top of the tsunami deposit will be a muddy deposit, representative of an area subjected to ocean tides.

Global warming
The mountain pine beetle, Dendroctonus ponderosae Hopkins, is a significant ecological force at the landscape level. The majority of the life cycle is spent as larvae feeding in the phloem tissue (inner bark) of host pine trees. This feeding activity eventually girdles and kills
successfully attacked trees. Mismanaged forests has resulted in increased mountain pine beetle activity. These direct and indirect effects potentially have devastating consequences for whitebark and other high-elevation pines.

Examples 

 Odiorne Point in Rye, New Hampshire, USA, where a transatlantic cable was laid in 1874, and at extreme low tides on nearby Jenness Beach.
 Neskowin Ghost Forest

See also
 Neskowin Ghost Forest

References

Forestry